Jacques Bigot (26 July 1651 – April 1711) was a Jesuit priest who arrived in Canada in 1679 as a missionary to the Abenakis.

Bigot's first mission posting was at Sillery, Quebec, where the Abenakis had fled from the English. By 1683 he had relocated them to a site on the Chaudière River. The site had been granted to him by the Governor General of New France, Antoine Lefèbvre de La Barre.

Jacques strength was in his missionary work where he worked continually for the good of his community. His brother, Vincent Bigot was active in the missions at the same time and rose to the position of superior general and, subsequently, the procurator of Canadian missions.

References 
 Biography at the Dictionary of Canadian Biography Online
 Catholic Indian Missions of Canada

17th-century French Jesuits
1651 births
1711 deaths
18th-century French Jesuits
French Roman Catholic missionaries
Jesuit missionaries in New France